The 1968–69 Hong Kong First Division League season was the 58th since its establishment.

League table

References
1968–69 Hong Kong First Division table (RSSSF)

Hong Kong First Division League seasons
Hong
football